Enab Baladi is a Syrian nonprofit media organization that publishes a newspaper with the same name, in Arabic and English. It was established in Darayya, Syria in 2011, and is also a 501(c)(3) nonprofit organization.

History and profile
Enab Baladi newspaper was first launched in 2011 by a group of citizen journalists and activists from Daraya, a Syrian town in Damascus suburbs. On January 29, 2012, issue #0 was published marking the beginning of a revolutionary newspaper. Since then, it has been printed each week on Sundays, with one two-week stoppage in August 2012 due to the Darayya massacre committed by Assad forces.

Since its establishment during the first year of the Syrian uprising, late 2011, Enab Baladi (EB) has focused on promoting the peaceful resistance methods to counter the sectarian and violence narratives of the Syrian regime. EB coverage included the human rights violations perpetrated by the Syrian regime, as well as the inception of the nascent Syrian civil society, in addition to various news and topics in the fields of politics, economy, and social affairs.

Growth
The newspaper grew from amateur-run organization into becoming one of the most prominent Syrian media organizations according to BBC Syria profile page. Currently, Enab Baladi produces several products, Enab Baladi Weekly Newspaper, the Enab Online News Service Website, The Syrian Print-Media Archive, and its latest English news website. These projects are supported by a network of reporters and journalists who strive to give credible reports from the ground in Syria.

Enab Baladi succeeded in drawing the attention of many local and international media. Its story appeared on Der Spiegel, The Guardian, and AFP News among many others. The French magazine Elle published an article about EB's women team, “THE "GANG OF GIRLS" RISKS THEIR LIVES TO REPORT FROM INSIDE A WAR ZONE”. Around ten women are working as reporters, editors, and translators for EB. The article tells the story of one of them, Kholoud Waleed, and highlights the role that women played in the establishment of the newspaper, the challenges they faced during their work as citizen journalists in Syria and the success they achieved.

Partnerships, alliances, and coalitions
Enab Baladi built relationships with many international organizations such as National Endowment for Democracy, Internews, Free Press Unlimited, European Endowment for Democracy, l’Association de Soutien aux Médias Libres, Adopt a Revolution, L'agence française de coopération médias, Norwegian People’s Aid, and International Media Support.

Enab Baladi also joined many alliances and coalitions:
 The Ethical Journalism for Syria Alliance (EJSA) in partnership with more than 30 Syrian independent media organization and funded by Free Press Unlimited. The alliance aims at restoring and improving the basic fundamental rights of freedom of speech, thought, and expression in Syria via a gender sensitive multi-level approach.
 The International Coalition of Sites of Conscience (ICSC), and implemented a project of documenting the verbal heritage of the Syrian conflict in partnership with ICSC.
 The Syrian Network for Printed Media (SNP) with four other Syrian independent newspapers, through which, EB is printing and distributing its issues inside and outside Syria. 
 The Syrian Regional Program (SRP) to provide media exposure to Local Councils in Syria, the Assistance Coordination Unit (ACU), in addition to multimedia reports about local initiatives inside Syria.

Awards
The newspaper won two awards through two of its co-founders, Majd Sharbaji who won the U.S. State Department Women of Courage Award, and Kholoud Helmi who won the 2015 Anna Politkovskaya Award.

References

External links
 Official website

2011 establishments in Syria
Arabic-language newspapers
Mass media in Damascus
Weekly newspapers published in Syria
Publications established in 2011